The 1918–19 Northern Rugby Football Union season was the fourth  season of Rugby league's Wartime Emergency League football. Each club again played a differing number of fixtures, depending upon the closeness of neighbours, ease of travel etc.. The season tapered off towards the end when the 1919 (Feb-May) "Victory" League was hurriedly introduced.

Season summary

The war was starting its fifth year and the Rugby League again started the season by continuing with the Wartime Emergency League set up. This arrangement, as in other sports, meant that the sport could continue, which in turn would boost the public's moral. The fixtures were usually quite local, thus cutting down on travelling time and costs, whilst not wasting precious war resources.

Several clubs did not participate during this season :-

Huddersfield continued last season's absence from the competition
Oldham continued last season's absence from the competition
Wakefield Trinity continued last season's absence from the competition
York continued last season's absence from the competition
Keighley again did not take part and in fact did not re-enter the league until the first peacetime League in 1919-20.
Widnes once again withdrew
There are no records of Runcorn taking part.

No clubs  re-joined the League and no new clubs joined the league for this season.
Although it is known that St Helens Recs did play some matches during the season, it is not clear whether these were just friendlies or whether part of the league programme.

The armistice was signed in a railway carriage in Compiègne Forest on 11 November 1918, signifying an end to the Great War. This in turn meant a slight relaxation of the emergency rules on sport and leisure introduced by the British Government during the war. The Northern Union decided to organise a new "Victory" League" starting in February 1919. This in turn meant that the 1918–19 League programme seemed to peter out and was never finished. Consequently no table was ever produced for the "partial" season.
Note - Nowhere in the official archives is the word "Victory" used. It has been used in this article to distinguish between the two competitions held in the 1918–19 season.

There is very little information available for this partial season, although Wigan played 13 matches and Hull F.C. 12 matches.
The table below gives the teams competing in alphabetical order, only Wigan and Hull F.C. results are complete.

There were no other trophies to play for during this season.

Championship

Challenge Cup

The Challenge Cup Competition was suspended for the duration of the war. 
The majority of the trophies, such as the County Leagues and County Cups were also suspended for the duration of the First World War.

Notes and Comments 
1 - It is uncertain as to whether the matches played by St Helens Recs were friendlies or went towards the league programme

See also 
British rugby league system
1915–16 Northern Rugby Football Union Wartime Emergency League season
1916–17 Northern Rugby Football Union Wartime Emergency League season
1917–18 Northern Rugby Football Union Wartime Emergency League season
1918–1919 (January) Northern Rugby Football Union Wartime Emergency League season
1919 (Feb-May) Northern Rugby Football Union Victory season
The Great Schism – Rugby League View
The Great Schism – Rugby Union View
List of defunct rugby league clubs
Armistice with Germany

References

External links 
1896–97 Northern Rugby Football Union season at wigan.rlfans.com
Hull&Proud Fixtures & Results 1896/1897
 Widnes Vikings - One team, one passion Season In Review - 1896-97
Saints Heritage Society
Warington History
Wigan Archives - Cherry and white 

1918 in English rugby league
1919 in English rugby league
Northern Rugby Football Union seasons